Trae is a given name.

Notable people with the name "Trae" include

Trae Bell-Haynes (born 1995), Canadian basketball player
Trae Coyle (born 2001), English footballer
Trae Crowder (born 1986), American comedian 
Trae Elston (born 1994), American football player
Trae Golden (born 1991), American basketball player
Trae Waynes (born 1992), American football player
Trae Williams (born 1985), American football player
Trae Williams (sprinter) (born 1997), Australian sprinter
Trae Young (born 1998), American basketball player

See also
Trae tha Truth (born 1980), American hip hop recording artist
Tray (given name), a page for people with the given name "Tray"
Tre (given name), a page for people with the given name "Tre"
Trea (disambiguation), includes a list of people with the given name or nickname

English-language masculine given names